William E. Burrows is an American author and journalism professor emeritus. Born in Philadelphia, Pennsylvania on March 27, 1937, he was educated at Columbia University and became assistant professor of journalism in 1974.

Life
Burrows grew up in Rego Park, NY and graduated from Forest Hills High School. He holds a BA and an MA from Columbia University.

He worked as a reporter for newspapers such as The New York Times, The Washington Post, Foreign Affairs, and The Wall Street Journal. In 1970, he moved to Mallorca, Spain where he worked as a travel writer. He moved back to the United States in 1973 and joined the Journalism department at New York University. He was tenured in 1981. In 1983, he founded The Science and Environmental Reporting Program (SERP) of New York University.

Burrows specializes in space and national security issues and his latest book is The Asteroid Threat. He published Deep Black, a seminal work on reconnaissance and espionage in 1986.

He is the co-founder of the Alliance to Rescue Civilization. He is also Director Emeritus of the Science, Health, and Environmental Reporting Program at New York University. He is the author of twelve books and numerous articles in The New York Times, The Washington Post, The Wall Street Journal, The Richmond Times-Dispatch, Foreign Affairs, Harvard Magazine, Harper's and other publications. His most recent book, The Asteroid Threat: Defending Our Planet From Deadly Near-Earth Objects, was published on June 10, 2014. Burrows was the only non-scientist on the National Research Council's Near-Earth Object Survey and Detection Panel. In recognition of his distinguished career and expertise, a Main Belt asteroid has been named after him, and he is a recipient of the American Astronautical Society John F. Kennedy Astronautics Award, among other honors.

He is divorced and has one daughter, Lara Julie Burrows, a physician.

Works
The Asteroid Threat: Defending Our Planet From Deadly Near-Earth Objects, Prometheus Books, 2014,  
Vigilante, Harcourt Brace Jovanovich, 1976,  
Deep Black, Berkley Books, 1988,   
Exploring space: voyages in the solar system and beyond, Random House, 1990,  
William E. Burrows, Robert Windrem, Critical mass: the dangerous race for superweapons in a fragmenting world, Simon and Schuster, 1994,  
By Any Means Necessary: America's Secret Air War, Arrow, 2003,   

Richthofen: A True History of the Red Baron, Harcourt, Brace & World, 1969.
The Infinite Journey, New York: Discovery Books, 2000
Mission to Deep Space, New York: W. H. Freeman/Scientific American,  1993. 
On Reporting the News, New York: New York University Press, 1977.

Legacy
Asteroid 9930 Billburrows was named for him.

References

External links
 Burrows' profile at the ARC official website 
 Lifeboat Foundation profile
 

New York University faculty
American science writers
Columbia University alumni
Living people
People from Rego Park, Queens
Forest Hills High School (New York) alumni
1937 births